Seoul FC was a South Korean semi-professional football club that competed for 27 years in the semi-professional division. It was owned and funded by Seoul Metropolitan Government.

The club was founded on January 15, 1976, and joined the second stage of the 2003 National League season as temporary replacements for Hallelujah FC. Despite a reasonable mid-table finish, the club withdrew from the league as Hallelujah wanted to return for the 2004 season, and Seoul City were officially wound up on December 31, 2003.

Honours

Domestic competitions

League
 Korean National Semi-Professional Football League
 Winners (5): 1978 Spring, 1980 Spring, 1985 Autumn, 1988 Spring, 1989 Autumn

Cups
 National Football Championship
 Winners (3): 1980, 1982, 1986

See also
 Seoul WFC

Association football clubs established in 1976
Association football clubs disestablished in 2003
Defunct football clubs in South Korea
Football clubs in Seoul
1976 establishments in South Korea
2003 disestablishments in South Korea